Cong may refer to:

Cong (vessel), is a form of jade artifact from ancient China
Cong (surname), (叢/丛) a Chinese surname
Cong, County Mayo, a village in the Republic of Ireland
Cong Weixi (1933–2019), Chinese author influential in the post-Mao literary scene
Phunoi people, called Cống in Vietnam, an indigenous people
A slang name for the Vietcong

See also
Kong (disambiguation)